Narelle Kellner ( Jorgensen, 18 October 1934 – 20 December 1987) was an Australian chess player who held the title of Woman International Master (WIM, 1977). She was a two-time winner of the Australian Women's Chess Championship (1972, 1974).

Biography
Narelle Kellner won the Women's Chess Championships of New South Wales 21 times. Also she two times won Australian Women's Chess Championship (1972, 1974). In 1977, she was awarded the FIDE Woman International Master (WIM) title.

Narelle Kellner two times participated in the Women's World Chess Championship Interzonal Tournaments:
 In 1976, at Interzonal Tournament in Tbilisi ranked 11th place;
 In 1979, at Interzonal Tournament in Alicante shared 17th-18th place.

Narelle Kellner played for Australia in the Women's Chess Olympiads:
 In 1972, at first board in the 5th Chess Olympiad (women) in Skopje (+1, =3, -4),
 In 1976, at second board in the 7th Chess Olympiad (women) in Haifa (+3, =4, -2),
 In 1978, at second board in the 8th Chess Olympiad (women) in Buenos Aires (+4, =3, -4),
 In 1984, at second board in the 26th Chess Olympiad (women) in Thessaloniki (+3, =3, -5).

She worked as a primary school teacher. From 1961 she was married to Australian correspondence chess champion and Correspondence International Master John Vincent Kellner (1931-1987).

References

External links

1934 births
1987 deaths
Australian female chess players
Chess Woman International Masters
Chess Olympiad competitors
20th-century chess players